Andreas Lanfranchi (died 1659) was a Roman Catholic prelate who served as Bishop of Ugento (1650–1659).

Biography
Andreas Lanfranchi was ordained a priest the Congregation of Clerics Regular of the Divine Providence.
On 19 December 1650, he was appointed by Pope Innocent X as Bishop of Ugento. On 8 January 1651, he was consecrated bishop by Francesco Peretti di Montalto, Archbishop of Monreale with Ranuccio Scotti Douglas, Bishop Emeritus of Borgo San Donnino, and Francesco Biglia, Bishop of Pavia, as co-consecrators. He served as Bishop of Ugento until his death in 1659.

References

External links and additional sources
 (for Chronology of Bishops) 
 (for Chronology of Bishops) 

1659 deaths
17th-century Italian Roman Catholic bishops
Bishops appointed by Pope Innocent X
Theatine bishops